Hatuel (Hebrew: חטואל) is a surname, mostly commonly found in Israel. Notable people with the surname include:

Delila Hatuel (born 1980), Israeli Olympic foil fencer
Tali Hatuel, Israeli killed with her four daughters in a shooting attack
Yitzhak Hatuel (born 1962), Israeli Olympic foil fencer
Lydia Hatuel-Czuckermann (born 1963), Israeli Olympic foil fencer

Jewish surnames
Surnames of Israeli origin